Events in the year 1993 in Japan. It corresponds to Heisei 5 (平成5年)) in the Japanese calendar.

Incumbents
 Emperor: Akihito
 Prime Minister: Kiichi Miyazawa (L–Hiroshima) until August 9, Hosokawa Morihiro (JNP–Kumamoto)
 Chief Cabinet Secretary: Yōhei Kōno (L–Kanagawa) until August 9, Masayoshi Takemura (NPH–Shiga)
 Chief Justice of the Supreme Court: Ryōhachi Kusaba
 President of the House of Representatives: Yoshio Sakurauchi (L–Shimane) until June 18, Takako Doi (S–Hyōgo) from August 6
 President of the House of Councillors: Bunbē Hara (L–Tokyo)
 Diet sessions: 126th (regular, January 22 to June 18), 127th (special, August 5 to August 28), 128th (extraordinary, September 17 to 1994, January 29)

Governors
Aichi Prefecture: Reiji Suzuki 
Akita Prefecture: Kikuji Sasaki 
Aomori Prefecture: Masaya Kitamura 
Chiba Prefecture: Takeshi Numata 
Ehime Prefecture: Sadayuki Iga 
Fukui Prefecture: Yukio Kurita
Fukuoka Prefecture: Hachiji Okuda 
Fukushima Prefecture: Eisaku Satō
Gifu Prefecture: Taku Kajiwara 
Gunma Prefecture: Hiroyuki Kodera 
Hiroshima Prefecture: Toranosuke Takeshita (until 28 November); Yūzan Fujita (starting 29 November)
Hokkaido: Takahiro Yokomichi 
Hyogo Prefecture: Toshitami Kaihara 
Ibaraki Prefecture: Fujio Takeuchi (until 11 August); Masaru Hashimoto (starting 26 September)
Ishikawa Prefecture: Yōichi Nakanishi 
Iwate Prefecture: Iwao Kudō 
Kagawa Prefecture: Jōichi Hirai 
Kagoshima Prefecture: Yoshiteru Tsuchiya 
Kanagawa Prefecture: Kazuji Nagasu 
Kochi Prefecture: Daijiro Hashimoto 
Kumamoto Prefecture: Joji Fukushima 
Kyoto Prefecture: Teiichi Aramaki 
Mie Prefecture: Ryōzō Tagawa 
Miyagi Prefecture: Shuntarō Honma (until 4 October); Shirō Asano (starting 24 November)
Miyazaki Prefecture: Suketaka Matsukata 
Nagano Prefecture: Gorō Yoshimura 
Nagasaki Prefecture: Isamu Takada 
Nara Prefecture: Yoshiya Kakimoto
Niigata Prefecture: Ikuo Hirayama 
Oita Prefecture: Morihiko Hiramatsu 
Okayama Prefecture: Shiro Nagano 
Okinawa Prefecture: Masahide Ōta
Osaka Prefecture: Kazuo Nakagawa 
Saga Prefecture: Isamu Imoto 
Saitama Prefecture: Yoshihiko Tsuchiya
Shiga Prefecture: Minoru Inaba 
Shiname Prefecture: Nobuyoshi Sumita 
Shizuoka Prefecture: Shigeyoshi Saitō (until 23 June); Yoshinobu Ishikawa (starting 1 August)
Tochigi Prefecture: Fumio Watanabe
Tokushima Prefecture: Shinzo Miki (until 4 October); Toshio Endo (starting 4 October)
Tokyo: Shun'ichi Suzuki 
Tottori Prefecture: Yuji Nishio 
Toyama Prefecture: Yutaka Nakaoki
Wakayama Prefecture: Shirō Kariya  
Yamagata Prefecture: Seiichirō Itagaki (until 2 February); Kazuo Takahashi (starting 14 February)
Yamaguchi Prefecture: Toru Hirai 
Yamanashi Prefecture: Ken Amano

Events
 January 15: A magnitude 7.8 earthquake offshore of Kushiro, Hokkaido, according to Fire and Disaster Management Agency confirmed report, two person were lost to lives with 966 person injures.
 January 27: Sumo wrestler Akebono Tarō becomes the first non-Japanese to reach the rank of yokozuna.
 April 15: 10th anniversary of the opening of Tokyo Disneyland.
 May 15: The J-League is established
 June 9: Crown Prince Naruhito marries Masako Owada.
 June 22: New Party Sakigake breaks away from the Liberal Democratic Party.
 July 7 - July 9: G7 summit is held in Tokyo.
 July 16: The Yokohama Landmark Tower, Japan's tallest building until the opening of the Abeno Harukas skyscraper, is completed.
 July 18: General elections for the House of Representatives of Japan are held. The Liberal Democratic Party fails to secure a majority.
 August 1 to 6: A torrential rain and debris flow occur in Kagoshima area, Kyushu Island, according to a report by the Fire and Disaster Management Agency, 72 people died and 142 were injured. 
 August 3: Kono Statement issued by Japanese government.
 August 6: Hosokawa Morihiro is elected as new Prime Minister of Japan. A non-Liberal Democratic Party coalition government composed of seven parties is formed.
October 5: According to former Japan Transport Ministry official announced, a people mover vehicle crush over stop position in Suminoekōen Station, Osaka City, resulting to 215 person were hurt.

Births
 January 6 – Taku Yashiro, voice actor
 January 12 
 Aika Mitsui, singer
 Yu Inaba, actor 
 January 29 – Kyary Pamyu Pamyu, singer and model
 January 30 - Kodai Senga, professional baseball player
 February 13 - Kasumi Arimura, actress
 February 16 - Sōsuke Genda, professional baseball player
 February 20 - Nanami Hashimoto, idol singer, model, actress
 February 23 - Kasumi Ishikawa, table tennis player
 March 24 - Ryo Ryusei, actor
 April 1 - Keito Okamoto, singer
 April 11 - Yūji Takahashi, footballer
 April 26 - Kaoru Mitsumune, actress and model 
 May 3 - Shuto Takajo, professional baseball player
 May 9 - Ryosuke Yamada, actor and singer
 May 10 - Mirai Shida, actress
 May 17 – Ayaka Sayama, gravure idol 
 June 15 - Kanna Arihara, singer
 June 21 - Reni Takagi, idol 
 July 2 - Yosuke Kishi, singer and actor 
 July 13 - Rena Nōnen, actress and fashion model
 July 14 - Sayaka Yamamoto, singer and actress
 July 15 - Masataka Yoshida, professional baseball player
 July 30 - Miho Miyazaki, singer and actress  
 August 3 – Yurina Kumai, singer
 August 4 – Alan Shirahama, singer, dancer and actor
 August 5 – Suzuka Ohgo, child actress
 August 6 – Kaori Ishihara, voice actress 
 August 9 - Kensuke Kondo, professional baseball player
 August 10 - Yuto Nakajima, singer 
 August 28 – Sora Amamiya, voice actress and singer. 
 August 31 – Haruka Imai, figure skater
 September 1 - Shōta Imanaga, professional baseball player
 September 19 – Miyuki Watanabe, singer and model
 November 10 - Azusa Tadokoro, voice actress and singer
 November 20 – Sumire Satō, actress and idol
 November 26 – Erena Ono, singer
 November 30 – Yuri Chinen, singer and actor
 December 7 - Kiyou Shimizu, karate martial artist
 December 15 - Yuko Araki, actress and model
 December 18 - Riria, actress
 December 23 - Ruriko Kojima, gravure idol and sportscaster
 December 24 - Mariya Nishiuchi, actress, model and singer-songwriter
 December 25 - Emi Takei, actress, model and singer
 December 28 - Yua Shinkawa, actress and model

Deaths

 January 22: Kōbō Abe, author (b. 1924)
 February 9: Saburo Okita, former foreign minister (b. 1914)
 February 28: Ishirō Honda, film director (b. 1911)
 April 2: Masaichi Niimi,  admiral in the Imperial Japanese Navy during the Second World War  (b. 1887)
 July 3: Tadao Yoshida, founder of the YKK Group, the world's largest zipper manufacturer (b. 1908)
 July 10: Masuji Ibuse, writer (b. 1898)
 August 6: Genkei Masamune, botanist (b. 1899)
 August 21: Ichirō Fujiyama, composer and singer (b. 1911)
 October 29: Masahiro Makino, film director (b. 1908)
 November 14: Sanzō Nosaka, one of the founders of the Japanese Communist Party (b. 1892)
 December 16: Kakuei Tanaka, former Prime Minister of Japan (b. 1918)
 December 20: Iichirō Hatoyama, politician and diplomat (b. 1918)

Statistics
Yen value: US$1 = ¥109.91 (December 1)

See also
 1993 in Japanese television
 List of Japanese films of 1993

References

 
Years of the 20th century in Japan
Japan